This is a list of broadcast television stations serving cities in the Canadian province of British Columbia.

See also
List of television stations in Canada
Media in Canada

References

British Columbia
 
Television stations